Aptenopedes sphenarioides, the linear-winged grasshopper, is a species of spur-throated grasshopper in the family Acrididae. It is found in North America.

Subspecies
These three subspecies belong to the species Aptenopedes sphenarioides:
 Aptenopedes sphenarioides appalachee Hebard, 1936 i
 Aptenopedes sphenarioides clara Rehn, 1902 i g
 Aptenopedes sphenarioides sphenarioides Scudder, 1878 i g
Data sources: i = ITIS, c = Catalogue of Life, g = GBIF, b = Bugguide.net

References

Melanoplinae
Articles created by Qbugbot
Insects described in 1878